Paraclara is a genus of parasitic flies in the family Tachinidae. There are at least two described species in Paraclara.

Species
These two species belong to the genus Paraclara:
 Paraclara dimidiata (Brauer & Bergenstamm, 1889)
 Paraclara magnifica Bezzi, 1908

References

Further reading

 
 
 
 

Tachinidae
Articles created by Qbugbot